Haugstvedt is a Norwegian surname. Notable people with the surname include:

Asbjørn Haugstvedt (1926–2008), Norwegian politician
Morten Haugstvedt, Norwegian handball player

Norwegian-language surnames